"Für immer" (Forever) is the second single from Unheilig's album Grosse Freiheit. It was released as a regular 2-track single and a limited deluxe version. The deluxe version comes in a digipak, includes a poster and is limited to 3000 copies worldwide.

Track listing

Music video
On April 30, 2010, the official music video for "Für immer" was released.

2010 singles
2010 songs
Vertigo Records singles
Unheilig songs